Monk's Music is a jazz album by the Thelonious Monk Septet, which for this recording included Coleman Hawkins and John Coltrane. It was recorded in New York City on June 26, 1957, and released in October the same year.

Recording and music
The first song, "Abide With Me"—a hymn by W. H. Monk—is played only by the septet's horn section. The song "Ruby, My Dear" is performed only by Monk, Coleman Hawkins, Wilbur Ware, and Art Blakey. John Coltrane had joined Monk after playing with the Miles Davis Quintet, and Monk can be heard enthusiastically calling on him ("Coltrane! Coltrane!") to take the first horn solo on the album in "Well, You Needn't." All of the songs except one are original compositions by Monk; all of the originals but "Crepuscule with Nellie" had appeared on previous Monk albums and singles in prior performances.

Mono vs. stereo

This was the first Riverside Thelonious Monk album recorded and released in both mono (RLP 12-242) and stereo (RLP 1102). The stereo version was released 9 months after the mono, in August 1958. It has been noted that the mixes of these releases are extremely different. The stereo mix, while featuring the same performances as does the mono version, used an entirely different set of microphones, suspended from the ceiling, while the mono release used microphones in closer proximity to the instruments. As a result, the stereo mix has a more distant sound and Wilbur Ware's bass is much less audible.

Producer Orrin Keepnews explained:

In the notes to the 1986 Riverside Monk box, Keepnews wrote:

The original stereo LP release did not list "Crepuscule with Nellie" on its label or cover track listing (although it was referenced in the liner notes), and did not include it on the album, though the mono version always included the piece. A circa-1965 stereo re-release with serial number RLP 12-9242 also skipped "Crepuscule with Nellie", even though it was listed on the label and cover. The 1967 "stereo" pressing (RS 3004) distributed by ABC Records was an "electronically reprocessed" version of the mono mix. A 1977 Japanese vinyl version appears to be the first true stereo release that also includes the (mono) "Crepuscule with Nellie".

Reception
The album was inducted into the Grammy Hall of Fame in 2001.

Re-releases
The album was reissued by Original Jazz Classics on July 1, 1991.

Track listing 
All songs by Thelonious Monk unless otherwise noted.

Side A
"Abide with Me" (Henry Francis Lyte, William Henry Monk) – 0:54
"Well, You Needn't" – 11:24
"Ruby, My Dear" – 5:26

Side B
"Off Minor" – 5:07
"Epistrophy" (Monk, Kenny Clarke) – 10:46
"Crepuscule With Nellie" – 4:38 
(Note:  "Crepuscule With Nellie" is missing from most or all true stereo vinyl releases of the album, even when listed, through at least the 1960s (see explanation above). In addition, the track, when listed, is misspelled as "Crepescule With Nellie" on the cover and label of most issues of the album.)

CD reissue
"Abide With Me" – 0:54
"Well, You Needn't" – 11:24
"Ruby, My Dear" – 5:26
"Off Minor (Take 5)" – 5:07
"Off Minor (Take 4)" – 5:12
"Epistrophy" – 10:46
"Crepuscule with Nellie (Take 6)" – 4:38
"Crepuscule with Nellie (Take 4 and 5)" – 4:43

Original Jazz Classics Remasters
"Abide With Me" – 0:54
"Well, You Needn't" – 11:24
"Ruby, My Dear" – 5:26
"Off Minor (Take 5)" – 5:07
"Epistrophy" – 10:46
"Crepuscule with Nellie (Take 6)" – 4:38
"Off Minor (Take 4)" – 5:12
"Crepuscule with Nellie (Takes 4 and 5)" – 4:43
"Blues for Tomorrow" – 13:32

Personnel
 Thelonious Monk – piano on tracks 2-6
 Ray Copeland – trumpet on tracks 1, 2, 4-6
 Gigi Gryce – alto saxophone and arrangements on tracks 1, 2, 4-6
 Coleman Hawkins – tenor saxophone
 John Coltrane – tenor saxophone on tracks 1, 2, 4-6
 Wilbur Ware – double bass on tracks 2-6
 Art Blakey – drums on tracks 2-6
 Orrin Keepnews – production
 Jack Higgins – recording engineering
 Kirk Felton – digital remastering
 Paul Weller – cover photography
 Paul Bacon – cover design

References

External links
 John Coltrane discography
 Monk's records

1957 albums
Albums produced by Orrin Keepnews
Albums with cover art by Paul Bacon
Grammy Hall of Fame Award recipients
Riverside Records albums
Thelonious Monk albums